The Mongolia international or Mongolia Satellite is an open international badminton tournament in Mongolia organised by the Mongolian Badminton Association, sanctioned by the Badminton World Federation and Badminton Asia. This tournament established since 2005, and has been an International Series level since 2007. In 2019, it was promoted to International Challenge level.

Previous winners

Performances by countries

References 

Badminton tournaments
Badminton tournaments in Mongolia
Sports competitions in Mongolia